Daniela Melchior ((); born November 1, 1996) is a Portuguese actress. After beginning her career in her home country, she garnered worldwide attention with her English-language debut as Ratcatcher 2 in the DC Extended Universe (DCEU) film The Suicide Squad (2021).

Career

2014-2020: Portuguese Film and Television 
Melchior started her career in 2014 with several Portuguese film and television productions, including Ouro Verde, A Herdeira, The Black Book, and Parque Mayer. She also provided the Portuguese voice for Spider-Gwen / Gwen Stacy in Sony Pictures Animation's Spider-Man: Into the Spider-Verse, who is voiced by Hailee Steinfeld in the original English version.

2021–present: Jump to Hollywood 
In August 2021, Melchior appeared in her first English-language theatrical film, James Gunn's DCEU film The Suicide Squad, as a unique version of the Batman villain Ratcatcher, Cleo Cazo / Ratcatcher 2, alongside Margot Robbie, Idris Elba, John Cena and Viola Davis, marking the first actress from Portugal to play a character in a DCEU film. James Gunn described her as being "the heart of the film", and she has the second longest screen time. 

Melchior will star with Henry Golding, Noomi Rapace and Sam Neill in spy movie Assassin Club directed by Camille Delamarre and written by Thomas C. Dunn, with production in Turin, Italy. She will star in Marlowe directed by Neil Jordan, alongside Liam Neeson, Diane Kruger and Jessica Lange. By March 2022, she joined the cast of the tenth Fast & Furious film titled Fast X, Vin Diesel, and The Suicide Squad co-stars John Cena and Michael Rooker, as well as Scott Eastwood, who appeared in Suicide Squad, the predecessor to her DC comics film. In June 2022 she announced that she will collaborate for the second time with James Gunn in his MCU film Guardians of the Galaxy Vol. 3, starring Chris Pratt, Zoe Saldaña, Dave Bautista, Bradley Cooper, Vin Diesel (before appearing with him in Fast X,) Will Poulter, and Sylvester Stallone (her The Suicide Squad co-star,) making her the first actress from Portugal to portray a Marvel character and to appear in an MCU film.

In August 2022, she was cast in Road House, a remake of the 1989 film starring Patrick Swayze.

Personal life
Melchior is the first Portuguese actress to star in a DCEU or MCU film.

Melchior stated in an interview how she got herself in Hollywood: "I got scripts on the table saying We want you".

In May 2022 Melchior was criticized for her nose when a person told her that she had a "Potato nose", to which she politely replied in a story from Instagram: « This is why girls grow up thinking there's something wrong with their face (I myself have had photos and videos I didn't post online because i didn't feel comfortable with my nose); they only feel comfortable using filters or having surgery. – I'm not against seeking to be your best version FOR YOURSELF, but self-acceptance is very important. Girls, noses don't exist to be pretty, or thin, or upturned, they exist to breathe (and other things) and not look like Voldemort (character from Harry Potter) ». Then, in a later story, the actress stated that the response was in no way meant to offend the person.

Filmography

Film

Television

Awards and nominations

References

External links 
 
 

1996 births
21st-century Portuguese actresses
Living people
People from Almada
Portuguese female models
Portuguese film actresses
Portuguese television actresses
Portuguese voice actresses